Zielona Góra may refer to the following places:
Zielona Góra, Greater Poland Voivodeship (west-central Poland)
Zielona Góra, Łódź Voivodeship (central Poland)
Zielona Góra in Lubusz Voivodeship (west Poland)
Zielona Góra, Pomeranian Voivodeship (north Poland)

See also
Zielonagóra, in Szamotuły County, Greater Poland Voivodeship